Clay Township is one of fourteen townships in Morgan County, Indiana, United States. As of the 2010 census, its population was 4,292 and it contained 1,707 housing units.

The township contains the incorporated towns of Brooklyn and Bethany, and the unincorporated town of Centerton. The entire township lies within the Metropolitan School District of Martinsville, with elementary schools at both Brooklyn and Centerton.

Clay Township is also home to the Goethe Link Observatory and Bradford Woods, both affiliated to Indiana University.

Fire protection is provided to the township by the Brooklyn Volunteer Fire Department, which operates stations in Brooklyn and on Robb Hill Road.

History
The Franklin Landers-Black and Adams Farm and Bradford Estate are listed on the National Register of Historic Places.

Geography

Cities, towns, villages
 Bethany
 Brooklyn

Unincorporated towns
 Beech Grove at 
 Center Valley at 
 Centerton at 
(This list is based on USGS data and may include former settlements.)

Cemeteries
The township contains these two cemeteries: Brooklyn and Butterfield.

Major highways
  Indiana State Road 67

Airports and landing strips
 Hilhon Airport

Lakes
 Jewel Lake
 Old Swimmin Hole Lake

School districts
 Metropolitan School District of Martinsville Schools

Political districts
 Indiana's 4th congressional district
 State House District 47
 State Senate District 37

References
 
 United States Census Bureau 2008 TIGER/Line Shapefiles
 IndianaMap

External links
 Indiana Township Association
 United Township Association of Indiana
 City-Data.com page for Clay Township

Townships in Morgan County, Indiana
Townships in Indiana